The 2022 Limerick Premier Intermediate Hurling Championship was the ninth staging of the Limerick Premier Intermediate Hurling Championship since its establishment by the Limerick County Board in 2014. The championship ran from 29 July to 29 October 2022.

The final was played on 29 October 2022 at FitzGerald Park in Kilmallock, between Monaleen and Bruff, in what was their first ever meeting in the final. Monaleen won the match by 2-16 to 0-16 to claim their first ever championship title in the grade.

Team changes

To Championship

Relegated from the Limerick Senior Hurling Championship
 Monaleen

Promoted from the Limerick Intermediate Hurling Championship
 Effin

From Championship

Promoted to the Limerick Senior Hurling Championship
 Mungret/St. Paul's

Relegated to the Limerick Intermediate Hurling Championship
 Murroe-Boher

Group stage

Group table

Knockout stage

Semi-finals

Final

References

External links

 Limerick GAA website

Limerick Premier Intermediate Hurling Championship
Limerick Premier Intermediate Hurling Championship